Joshua Ford (born November 6, 1987) is a retired American soccer player. He is currently an assistant coach for Tacoma Defiance of the USL Championship.

Career

College and Amateur
Ford attended the University of Connecticut where he set school records with 50 shutouts, 85 consecutive starts and 54 wins during his four years.  He was also named Third Team All-Big East in 2007 and 2009, First Team All-Big East in 2010, First Team College Soccer News All-American and Big East Goalkeeper of the Year.

Ford spent two seasons with the Rhode Island Stingrays of the USL Premier Development League.

Professional
On January 18, 2011, Ford was selected in the first round (11th overall) of the 2011 MLS Supplemental Draft by Seattle Sounders FC.  On March 9, Ford won the job as the number three goalkeeper for Seattle over Bryan Meredith. He was officially signed by Seattle on March 14, 2011.

After not making a single appearance for the Sounders, Ford was loaned to USL Pro club Orange County Blues FC.  He made his professional debut on May 10, 2014 and assisted on a game-winning goal by Gibson Bardsley in a 1–0 away win over Oklahoma City Energy FC.

In December 2014, Seattle declined Ford's contract option for 2015 and he entered the 2014 MLS Re-Entry Draft. In stage two of the draft Ford was selected by expansion side Orlando City SC.

On May 29, 2015, it was announced that Ford had joined the Ft. Lauderdale Strikers on a short-term loan.

Ford signed with United Soccer League club San Antonio FC on February 12, 2016.

Personal
Ford grew up in Liverpool, New York where he helped lead his school team to two state championship finals. Ford is the younger brother of Stanley Ford who also played college soccer at UConn.

Career statistics

Statistics accurate as of May 10, 2014

References

External links
 
 UConn Huskies bio

1987 births
Living people
American soccer players
UConn Huskies men's soccer players
Rhode Island Stingrays players
Seattle Sounders FC players
Orange County SC players
Orlando City SC players
Fort Lauderdale Strikers players
San Antonio FC players
Association football goalkeepers
People from Liverpool, New York
Soccer players from New York (state)
Seattle Sounders FC draft picks
USL League Two players
USL Championship players
North American Soccer League players
Major League Soccer players
Seattle Sounders FC non-playing staff
Liverpool High School alumni